Albert Russell Aukerman was an early professional football player-coach for the Latrobe Athletic Association. Prior to that, he was a halfback at Gettysburg College. He entered the College in 1893 at the age of 20. Because of his maturity, he was elected captain of the football team. He emerged as one of the premier rushers of his day. Over a three-year period, he produced the winning points in wins over Dickinson, Washington & Jefferson, Franklin College and Marshall University. He was also an accomplished track athlete for Gettysburg, running the 100 and 200 meter relays and also the long jump. He left school to become a physical instructor at the Latrobe A. A. He was then picked to be the team's first head coach in 1895. He formed what became one of the first professional football teams and is credited with scoring the first professional touchdown, with John Brallier in a game against the Jeannette Athletic Club. Aukerman also played pro football for the Duquesne Country and Athletic Club for two games in 1895 at Exposition Park

Aukerman was elected into the Gettysburg College Hall of Athletic Honor in 1990.

References
Gettysburg College HOF profile

Year of birth missing
Year of death missing
19th-century players of American football
American football halfbacks
Player-coaches
Duquesne Country and Athletic Club players
Gettysburg Bullets football players
Latrobe Athletic Association coaches
Latrobe Athletic Association players